Geir Ove Kvalheim (born 30 April 1970 in Bergen, Norway) is a Norwegian producer, film director, actor and writer. He is a former politician in the Norwegian Labour Party's youth movement.

Legal dispute with SS veterans
In 2000 Kvalheim began work on a film about Norwegian veterans of the SS. He later claimed to have revealed a Nazi network in the process, and to have received death threats from this network.

References

1970 births
Living people
Mass media people from Bergen
Norwegian male television actors
Norwegian film directors
Norwegian film producers